Nazli George (born 28 May 1966), is a South African actress. She is best known for her roles in the popular films Vehicle 19, Hoofmeisie and Max and Mona. She is the only female actor from the Cape Flats that writes her own work, performs.

Personal life
She was born on 28 May 1966 in Lansdowne, Cape Town, South Africa. After her birth, her parents were divorced. When she was a baby, her mom died. Since the age of 11 she started to live with her grandmother. Her grandfather died at the age of 94.

She attended Portia Primary school in Lansdowne. At the age of 6 she started ballet where she joined the Carol Shapiro School of ballet. Later she received Ccechetti Training and remained at ballet school privately until after matric. After matric, she attended Wynberg Senior Secondary school where she became one of the first matriculants to do the joint matriculation board exams in drama and ballet. As a prolific ballet dancer, she performed in several festivals where she won awards. She is also an alumnus of University of Cape Town and Trinity College London.

She is married and is a mother of a daughter.

Career
She has written, directed, produced top productions that all opened at the Baxter Theatre. In 1995, she founded the theater production company, 'NG Promotions'.

She appeared in the Afrikaans television serials Andries Plak and Riemvasmaak. Both of her roles in these serials became highly popular. In 2011, she starred in the comedy show 'Colour TV'. In 2019, she was invited to act in the popular television soap opera 7de Laan. She debuts in the serial on 25 December 2019 with the role of 'Ivy Peterson'.

Television roles
 7de Laan - Season 1 as Ivy Peterson
 90 Plein Street - Season 3 as Shireen
 Andries Plak - Season 1 as Milly van der Westhuizen
 Binnelanders - Season 10 as Dawn
 Colour TV - Season 1 as Various Roles
 Dryfsand - Season 1 as Hilde Lindenberg
 Erfsondes - Season 1 as Older Sally
 Getroud met Rugby: Die Sepie - Season 2 and 3 as Gasspeler
 Homeland - Season 4 as Staff Nurse
 Jozi Streets - Season 1 as Hazel
 Knapsekêrels - Season 1 as Naomi Fortuin
 Meeulanders - Season 1 as Magdaleen White
 Plek van die Vleisvreters - Season 1 as Hettie September
 Riemvasmaak - Season 1 as Anna Malgas
 Roer Jou Voete - Season 1 as Ounooi
 Swartwater - Season 1 and 2 as Dotty
 Those Who Can't - Season 2 as Mrs Isaacs

Filmography

References

External links
 

Living people
South African television actresses
South African film actresses
1966 births
People from Cape Town